Terence "Terry" R. Robbins (28 July 1934 – 17 November 2015) was a Welsh rugby union, and professional rugby league footballer who played in the 1950s and 1960s.

International honours
Robbins won a cap for Wales (RL) while at Bramley in 1963 against France.

Outside of rugby
Terry Robbins was the landlord in the Leeds public houses; Fforde Greene, Roundhay Road, Harehills, the Compton Arms, Harehills, the Kings Arms, Meanwood Road, and the Welcome Inn, Tinshill which was the home of West Park Old Boys RUFC (later named West Park Bramhope RUFC, and now named West Park Leeds RUFC ).

Genealogical information
Terry Robbins was married to Ida (born c.1934), they had children; a son Mark Robbins.

References

External links
Team – Past Players – Q-R at swansearfc.co.uk
Profile at swansearfc.co.uk
Leeds rugby clubs
(archived by web.archive.org) Ronnie Colin scores an hat-trick against Leeds

1934 births
2015 deaths
Bramley RLFC players
Publicans
Rugby league players from Merthyr Tydfil
Rugby league second-rows
Rugby union players from Merthyr Tydfil
Swansea RFC players
Wales national rugby league team players
Welsh rugby league players
Welsh rugby union players